St Helens is a rural locality in the Fraser Coast Region, Queensland, Australia.

Geography
The Mary River forms the short north-eastern boundary, while Saltwater Creek forms the north-western and northern boundaries on its way to the Mary.

Road infrastructure
The Maryborough–Hervey Bay Road (State Route 57) runs through from south-east to north-east.

References 

Fraser Coast Region
Localities in Queensland